The UNESCO/Guillermo Cano World Press Freedom Prize, created in 1997, honours a person, organization or institution that has made an outstanding contribution to the defence and/or promotion of press freedom anywhere in the world, especially when this has been achieved in the face of danger.

The prize, worth US$ 25,000, is awarded each year on the occasion of World Press Freedom Day on 3 May.

The prize is named after Guillermo Cano Isaza, the editor of the Colombian newspaper El Espectador, who was murdered in Bogotá on 17 December 1986. Cano was a vocal critic of the country's powerful drug barons.

Each year, an independent jury of six news professionals selected by the UNESCO Director-General selects a winner from the many nominations submitted by non-governmental organizations working in the field of press freedom, and by UNESCO Member States. The jury remains in charge for a period of three years, renewable once.

The anti-mafia italian journalist Marilù Mastrogiovanni serve as Chair of the jury in 2021. Other members of the Jury are: 

 Wendy Funes (Honduras), investigative journalist; 
 David Dembele (Mali), Editor-in-chief of the Depêche du Mali/L’Investigateur; 
 Hamid Mir (Pakistan), Executive Editor of Geo Television Pakistan;
 Alfred Lela (Albania), Political Analyst on News 24 and Founder and Director of Politiko;
 Zainab Salbi (Iraq), As a journalist, she created and hosted several shows including: #MeToo, Now What? on PBS (2018)

Award Winners

See also

World Press Freedom Day
William O. Douglas Prize

References

External links
Official website

Guillermo
Journalism awards
Free expression awards